George Simonds may refer to:

George Blackall Simonds (1843–1929), British sculptor
George Simonds, his father, British brewer at H & G Simonds Brewery
George S. Simonds (1874–1938), US military officer